In applied mathematics and computer science, variable splitting is a  decomposition method that relaxes a set of constraints.

Details
When the variable x appears in two sets of constraints, it is possible to substitute the new variables x1 in the first constraints and x2 in the second, and then join the two variables with a new "linking" constraint, which requires that 
 x1=x2.

This new linking constraint can be relaxed with a Lagrange multiplier; in many applications, a Lagrange multiplier can be interpreted as the price of equality between x1 and x2 in the new constraint.

For many problems, when the equality of the split variables is relaxed, then the system is decomposed, and each subsystem can be solved independently, at substantial reduction of computing time and memory storage. A solution to the relaxed problem (with variable splitting) provides an approximate solution to the original problem: further, the approximate solution to the relaxed problem provides a "warm start", a good initialization of an iterative method for solving the original problem (having only the x variable).

This was first introduced by Kurt O. Jörnsten, Mikael Näsberg, Per A. Smeds in 1985. At the same time, M. Guignard and S. Kim introduced the same idea under the name Lagrangean Decomposition (their papers appeared in 1987). The original references are 
(1) Variable Splitting: A New Lagrangean Relaxation Approach to Some Mathematical Programming Models
Authors	Kurt O. Jörnsten, Mikael Näsberg, Per A. Smeds Volumes 84-85 of LiTH MAT R.: Matematiska Institutionen Publisher - University of Linköping, Department of Mathematics, 1985 Length -	52 pages; and (2) Lagrangean  Decomposition: A Model Yielding Stronger Bounds, Authors Monique Guignard and Siwhan  Kim,  Mathematical Programming, 39(2), 1987, pp. 215-228.

References

Bibliography
 
 
 
 

Decomposition methods